The Biella Challenger Indoor is a professional tennis tournament played on indoor hard courts. It is currently part of the ATP Challenger Tour. It is held in Biella, Italy.

Past finals

Singles

Doubles

References

ATP Challenger Tour
Hard court tennis tournaments
Tennis tournaments in Italy
Recurring sporting events established in 2021